Zelus longipes is an assassin bug (Reduviidae) that is a member of the Harpactorinae subfamily. Its distribution ranges include southern North America, Central America, and South America (except Chile), especially in agroecosystems in Brazil.

Zelus longipes has been considered as a potential biocontrol agent, as it prefers caterpillars of Spodoptera frugiperda, which is a moth that is a pest in cornfields.  The species is a generalist predator, commonly used to combat picture-winged flies (Diptera: Ulidiidae), which cause damage to sweet corn yields in Florida.  Z. longipes prefers smaller caterpillars, probably because there is less risk of injury while subduing smaller prey.

References

External links
Zelus longipes on the UF / IFAS Featured Creatures Web site

Reduviidae
Hemiptera of North America